Woman (여 - Yeo) is a 1968 three-part South Korean film directed by Kim Ki-young, Jung Jin-woo and Yu Hyun-mok. The film was based on ideas of Kim Ki-young's wife, Kim Yu-bong, and Kim directed the last third.

Synopsis
The film is a melodrama about a man who falls in love with a woman while traveling to Seoraksan. The man becomes infatuated with the woman's hair. The woman, who has a terminal illness, promises to leave her hair to the man after she has died. Later the man finds that the woman has died, and her hair has been sold to someone else. He then has a romantic relationship with another woman who turns out to be his mother.

Cast
Shin Seong-il
Moon Hee
Kim Ji-mee
Choi Eun-hee

References

Bibliography

External links

Films directed by Kim Ki-young
Films directed by Jung Jin-woo
1960s Korean-language films
South Korean drama films